Perittia obscurepunctella is a moth of the family Elachistidae found in Europe.

Description
The wingspan is 8–10 mm. The forewings are light shining grey, somewhat darker-sprinkled ; plical stigma dark fuscous, elongate, followed by some whitish scales, second discal fuscous, indistinct. Hindwings are grey. The larva is  greenish grey ;dorsal line darker ; head dark brown ; plate of 2 blackish.

Biology
Adults are on wing from April to June.

The larvae feed on honeysuckle (Lonicera periclymenum), Tatarian honeysuckle (Lonicera tatarica), fly honeysuckle (Lonicera xylosteum) and sometimes common snowberry (Symphoricarpos albus). They mine the leaves of their host plant. The mine has the form of a brownish, full depth, inflated blotch, usually at the leaf margin, often with a central brown spot. Two to three larvae may be found in a single mine. Pupation takes place outside of the mine. Larvae can be found from June to early August.

Distribution
It is found from Sweden and Finland to the Pyrenees and Slovakia and from Ireland to the Baltic region and Poland.

References

External links
 lepiforum.de

Elachistidae
Leaf miners
Moths described in 1848
Moths of Europe